Ján Krošlák (born 17 October 1974) is a former tennis player from Slovakia, who turned professional in 1993.

He represented his native country at the 1996 Summer Olympics in Atlanta, United States, where he was defeated in the first round by America's MaliVai Washington. The right-hander reached his career-high ATP singles ranking of world No. 53 in September 1999. He won two singles title on the ATP Tour.

In the 1998 Davis Cup he played with Martin Hromec.

Political career
In 2020, Košlák was elected an MP of the National Council of Slovakia representing the Ordinary People and Independent Personalities along with a fellow former tennis players Karol Kučera and Romana Tabak. He departed from OĽaNO caucus in 2021, joining We Are Family parliamentary group. In December 2022, Krošlák was one of crucial MPs in a vote of no confidence to Heger's Cabinet. He stated he will declare no confidence and in so doing go against We Are Family parliamentary caucus. He departed from the caucus along with Martin Borguľa on 13 December and announced that he considers a move to a different political party ahead of next parliamentary elections, naming HLAS-SD as a potential destination.

ATP career finals

Singles: 3 (2 titles, 1 runner-up)

Doubles: 1 (1 runner-up)

ATP Challenger and ITF Futures finals

Singles: 6 (2–4)

Doubles: 2 (1–1)

Performance timeline

Singles

References

External links
 
 
 
 
 
 

1974 births
Living people
Slovak male tennis players
Slovak politicians
Tennis players at the 1996 Summer Olympics
Olympic tennis players of Slovakia
Tennis players from Bratislava
Members of the National Council (Slovakia) 2020-present